The Roman Catholic Diocese of Chełm(-Lublin) was a Latin Catholic bishopric in southeastern Poland, from 1257 (until 1358 as Łuków) until its suppression in 1805, which was restored as Latin titular see in 2009.

History 

 Established on 1257.02.01 as Diocese of Łuków, on territory split off from the then Roman Catholic Diocese of Kraków
 Renamed in 1358 as Diocese of Chełm
 Lost territory in 1772 to then Diocese of Przemyśl

 Cathedral moved to the Saint Francis Xavier church in Krasnystaw in 1773
 Renamed on 1790.08.08 as Diocese of Chełm–Lublin, having gained territory from Diocese of Kraków
 Lost territories repeatedly: in 1798.08.08 to the Diocese of Łuck and Żytomierz and on 1805.06.13 to establish the Diocese of Kielce
 Suppressed on 1805.09.22, its territory being reassigned to establish the then Diocese of Lublin (now Metropolitan).

Residential Ordinaries 
(all Roman Rite)

Suffragan Bishop of Łuków 
 Bartłomiej z Pragi, Friars Minor (O.F.M.) (born Bohemia, Czechia) (1257.02.01 – ?)

Suffragan Bishops of Chełm
 Tomasz da Sienno, O.F.M. (1359.05.20 – death 1365), previously Auxiliary Bishop of Diocese of Kraków (Poland) (? – 1359.05.20)
 Stefan da Leopoli, Dominican Order (O.P.) (1380 – death 1416)
 Jan Biskupiec (1417.05.01 – death 1452.04.22)
 Jan Tarnowski (1452.08.18 – death 1462.04.17)
 Paweł z Grabowa (1463.06.14 – death 1479.02.18)
 Jan Kaźmierski (1480.03.06 – 1484.05.10), next Bishop of Przemyśl (Poland) (1484.05.10 – death 1485.11.18)
 Jan z Targowiska (1484.05.14 – 1486.05.26), next Bishop of Przemyśl (Poland) (1486.05.26 – death 1492)
 Maciej ze Starej Łomży (1490.03.14 – death 1505.09.12), previously Bishop of Kamieniec Podolski (Poland) (1484.03.19 – 1490.03.14)
 Mikołaj Kościelecki (1505.11.14 – 1518.05.04)
 Jakub Buczacki (1518.11.05 – 1538.07.29), previously Bishop of Kamieniec Podolski (Poland) (1535.10.27 – 1538.07.29); later Bishop of Poznań (Poland) (1539.03.09 – death 1544)
 Samuel Maciejowski (1539.10.17 – 1541.08.22), next Bishop of Płock (Poland) (1541.08.22 – 1546.04.19), Bishop of Kraków (Poland) (1546.04.19 – death 1550.10.26)
 Mikołaj Dzierzgowski (1542.05.31 – 1543.03.30), previously Bishop of Kamieniec Podolski (Poland) (1541.05.20 – 1542.05.31); later Bishop of Kujawy–Pomorze (Poland) (1543.03.30 – 1546), Metropolitan Archbishop of Gniezno (Poland) (1546 – death 1559)
 Jan Dzieduski (1543.03.30 – 1545.06.08), previously Bishop of Kamieniec Podolski (Poland) (1542.05.31 – 1543.03.30); later Bishop of Przemyśl (Poland) (1545.06.08 – death 1559)
 Andrzej Zebrzydowski (1545.06.08 – 1546.02.19), previously Bishop of Kamieniec Podolski (Poland) (1543.03.30 – 1545.06.08); later Bishop of Kujawy–Pomorze (Poland) (1546.02.19 – 1551), Bishop of Kraków (Poland) (1551 – death 1560.05.23)
 Jan Drohojowski (1546.02.19 – 1551.09.25), previously Bishop of Kamieniec Podolski (Poland) (1545.08.26 – 1546.02.19); later Bishop of Kujawy–Pomorze (Poland) (1551.09.25 – 1557.06.25)
 Archbishop Jakub Uchański (18 November 1551 – 1561), next Bishop of Wrocław (Silesia, Bohemia) (1561.06.02 – 1562), Metropolitan Archbishop of Gniezno (Poland) (1562 – death 1581)
 Mikołaj Wolski (1561.06.02 – 1562.08.31), next Bishop of Kujawy–Pomorze (Poland) (1565 – 1567)
 Wojciech Staroźrebski Sobiejuski (1562.11.06 – 1577.12.11), next Bishop of Przemyśl (Poland) (1577.12.11 – death 1580)
 Adam Pilchowski (1578.06.16 – 1585)
 Wawrzyniec Goślicki (1590.01.22 – 1591.05.10), previously Bishop of Kamieniec Podolski (Poland) (1587.01.07 – 1590.01.22); later Bishop of Przemyśl (Poland) (1591.05.10 – 1601), Bishop of Poznań (Poland) (1601 – death 1607.10.31)
 Stanisław Gomoliński (1591.07.31 – 1600.08.30), previously Bishop of Kamieniec Podolski (Poland) (1590.02.12 – 1591.07.31); next Bishop of Łuck (Poland) (1600.08.30 – death 1604)
 Jerzy Zamoyski (1601.02.19 – death 1621.01.04)
 Maciej Łubieński (1621.05.17 – 1627.04.04), next Bishop of Poznań (Poland) (1627.04.04 – 1631), Metropolitan Archbishop of Gniezno (Poland) (1641 – death 1652)
 Auxiliary Bishop: Abraham Jan Jacek Śladkowski, Dominican Order (O.P.) (1622.05.02 – death 1643), Titular Bishop of Chytris (1622.05.02 – 1643)
 Remigiusz Koniecpolski (1627.05.17 – death 1640.10.26)
 Paweł Piasecki (1641.11.27 – 1644.11.28), previously Bishop of Kamieniec Podolski (Poland) (1627.12.20 – 1641.11.27); later Bishop of Przemyśl (Poland) (1644.11.28 – death 1649.08.01)
 Stanislaw Pstrokonski (1644.12.22 – death 1657.06.17)
 Auxiliary Bishop: Mikołaj Roman Świrski- (1644.12.12 – death 1678), Titular Bishop of Chytris (1644.12.12 – 1678)
 Tomasz Leżeński (1658.04.01 – 1667.09.05), next Bishop of Łuck (Poland) (1667.09.05 – death 1675)
 Jan Różycki (1667.11.14 – 1669.06.04)
 Krzysztof Żegocki (1670.06.30 – 1673)
 Stanisław Dąmbski (1673.12.18 – 1676.10.19)); next Bishop of Łuck (Poland) (1676.10.19 – 1682.04.20), Bishop of Płock (Poland) (1682.04.20 – 1692.07.07), Bishop of Kujawy–Pomorze (Poland) (1692.07.07 – 1700), Bishop of Kraków (Poland) (1700 – 1700.12.15)
 Stanisław Jacek Święcicki, Canons Regular of Saint Augustine (C.R.S.A.) (8 February 1677 – death 1696); previously Titular Bishop of Pegæ (1651.03.20 – 1677.02.08) as Auxiliary Bishop of Diocese of Samogitia (Lithuania) (1651.03.20 – 1677.02.08) 
 Auxiliary Bishop: Jan Konstanty Wożuczyński (1680.01.22 – death 1687.01.28), Titular Bishop of Byblus (1680.01.22 – 1687.01.28)
 Auxiliary Bishop: Jan Dłużewski (1696.06.18 – death 1720), Titular Bishop of Gratianopolis (1696.06.18 – 1720)
 Mikołaj Michał Wyżycki (1699.04.11 – death 1705.01.05)
 Kazimierz Łubieński (14 December 1705 – 10 May 1710), previously Titular Bishop of Heraclea in Europa (1701.01.03 – 1705.12.14) as Auxiliary Bishop of Kraków (Poland) (1701.01.03 – 1705.12.14); later Bishop of Kraków (Poland) (1710.05.10 – 1719.05.11)
 Teodor Wolff von Ludinghausen, Jesuit Order (S.J.) (10 November 1710 – death 9 May 1712), previously Titular Bishop of Tripolis (1701.03.14 – 1710.07.21) as Coadjutor Bishop of Inflanty (Poland) ([1700.04.25] 1701.03.14 – 1710.07.21), succeeding as Bishop of Inflanty (1710.07.21 – 1710.11.10)
 Krzysztof Andrzej Jan Szembek (30 July 1711 – 15 March 1719); later Bishop of Przemyśl (Poland) (1719.03.15 – 1724.09.11), Bishop of Warmia (Poland) ([1724.02.14] 1724.09.11 – 1740.03.16), Apostolic Administrator of Sambia (Prussia) (1724.09.11 – 1740.03.16)
 Alexander Antoni Pleszowice Fredro (29 March 1719 – 27 September 1724), next Bishop of Przemyśl (Poland) (1724.09.27 – death 1734.04.26)
 Auxiliary Bishop: Walenty Konstantyn Czulski (1721.02.12 – death 1724.02.10?), Titular Bishop of Claudiopolis in Honoriade (1721.02.12 – 1724.02.10?)
 Auxiliary Bishop: Michał de la Mars (1723.12.20 – death 1725.03), Titular Bishop of Tricomia (1723.12.20 – 1725.03)
 Jan Feliks Szaniawski (29 January 1725 – death 1733), succeeding as former Auxiliary Bishop of Chełm (1713.05.22 – 1725.01.29)
 Auxiliary Bishop: Józef Olszański (1727.06.25 – death 1738.05.16), Titular Bishop of Serræ (1727.06.25 – 1738.05.16)
 Józef Eustachy Szembek (1736.11.19 – 1753.01.29), next Bishop of Płock (Poland) (1753.01.29 – death 1758.04.01), Bishop of Warmia (Poland) ([1724.02.14] 1724.09.11 – 1740.03.16), Apostolic Administrator of Diocese of Sambia (Prussia) (1724.09.11 – death 1740.03.16)
BIOS TO ELABORATE
 Auxiliary Bishop: Józef Antoni Łaszcz (1738.06.23 – 1741.08.07)
 Auxiliary Bishop: Jan Chryzostom Krasiński (1748.09.16 – 1757.03.25)
 Walenty Franciszek Wężyk (1753.04.09 – 1765.04.22), next Bishop of Przemyśl (Poland) (1765.04.22 – death 1766)
 Auxiliary Bishop: Dominik Józef Kiełczewski (1760.07.21 – 1775.07.14)
 Feliks Paweł Turski (22 April 1765 – 4 March 1771)
 Antoni Onufry Okęcki (1771.03.04 – 1780.03.20)
 Auxiliary Bishop: Melchior Jan Kochnowski (1775.07.17 – 1788.04.30)
 Jan Alojzy Aleksandrowicz (1780 – 12 September 1781)

''Suffragan Bishops of Chełm–Lublin 
 Maciej Grzegorz Garnysz (1781 – 6 October 1790)
 Archbishop Wojciech Skarszewski (1790 – 22 September 1805).

Titular see 

The diocese was nominally restored in 2009 as Titular bishopric of Chełm / Chelmen(sis) (Latin adjective).

It has had the following incumbents, so far of the fitting Episcopal (lowest) rank :
 Stanisław Jamrozek (2013.04.20 – ...), Auxiliary Bishop of Przemyśl (Poland).

See also 
 the former Ukrainian Catholic Eparchy of Chełm–Bełz (Byzantine rite counterpart)
 List of Catholic dioceses in Poland

Sources and references 
 GCatholic - data for all sections

Catholic titular sees in Europe
Former Roman Catholic dioceses in Poland
Suppressed Roman Catholic dioceses